Grey Goose is a brand of vodka produced in France. It was created in the 1990s by Sidney Frank, who sold it to Bacardi in 2004. The Maître de Chai for Grey Goose is François Thibault, who developed the original recipe for the vodka in Cognac, France.

Company history
Grey Goose was created by Sidney Frank Importing Co (SFIC). Sidney Frank, founder/CEO of the company, developed the idea in the summer of 1997. The concept behind Grey Goose was to develop a luxury vodka for the American marketplace. SFIC partnered with cognac producer François Thibault (a French Maître de Chai, or, Cellar Master) in France in order to transition his skills from cognac to vodka production.

The company selected France due to the country's culinary history and it was to differentiate itself from other vodkas produced in Eastern Europe. The water used to produce the vodka came from natural springs in France filtered through Champagne limestone, and made with locally produced French wheat. The company also developed its distinctive smoked glass bottle, featuring French geese in flight and delivered its product in wooden crates similar to wine.

In 1998, Grey Goose was named the best-tasting vodka in the world by the Beverage Testing Institute. In 2001, Grey Goose released its first flavor, L’Orange, followed by Le Citron in 2002.

The company was eventually sold by Sidney Frank to Bacardi for a reported US$2.2 billion in 2004. That year, Grey Goose was the best-selling premium brand vodka in the United States, selling more than 1.5 million cases that year.

In 2018, Grey Goose partnered with Jamie Foxx for a nine-part online series called Off Script.

Product description 

The wheat used in the creation of Grey Goose vodka is grown in Picardy, France. Distilled in the same region, north and east of Paris, the distillate is then sent to Cognac, France, where it is blended with spring water and bottled. The wheat used in Grey Goose is soft winter wheat, sown in October and harvested in August, which provides it with four additional months of growth in comparison to summer wheat. The wheat sold to Grey Goose is categorized as "superior bread-making wheat", and wheat that is soft (i.e., low in protein).

Although made from wheat, as a distilled spirit, Grey Goose is gluten-free. The distillation process removes the gluten from the purified final product.

Enzymes are used to break down the carbohydrates into fermentable sugars. The fermentation takes place continuously over six cascading tanks, producing a 20-proof beer. The wash is then distilled into spirit using a five-step process. The water used in the vodka comes from a natural spring 150 meters (500 feet) below the blending facility in Cognac, which is lined with limestone, providing calcium-rich spring water. That water is then filtered to remove impurities. After the filtration the vodka is bottled in a plant dedicated solely to bottling Grey Goose. Grey Goose vodka is bottled with a replaceable cork rather than a screw-top cap.

References

External links

New York Times: A Humble Old Label Ices Its Rivals January 26, 2005.  (Relevant to topic on super premium vodka market.)

French vodkas
French brands
Bacardi
French companies established in 1997

he:וודקה#מותגי וודקה נודעים